Coosa may refer to:
 Coosa, Mississippi
 Coosa River
 Coosa County, Alabama
 Coosa chiefdom, which was visited by Hernando de Soto.
 Coosa High School, a secondary school in Floyd County, Ga.